Black and White is a 1999 television thriller film directed by Yuri Zeltser which stars Gina Gershon and Rory Cochrane.

Plot
A rookie Los Angeles police officer, Chris O'Brien (Cochrane), is partnered with a hard-edged officer, Nora Hugosian (Gershon). They develop a relationship at the same time that Hugosian is suspected of being a serial killer that is roaming the city.

Cast
 Gina Gershon as Nora 'Hugs' Hugosian
 Rory Cochrane as Chris O'Brien
 Ron Silver as Simon Herzel
 Alison Eastwood as Lynn Dombrowsky
 Ross Partridge as Michael Clemence/Armin Hugosian
 James Handy as Sergeant Wright

External links
 
 

1999 television films
1999 films
1999 thriller films
1990s police films
1990s serial killer films
Fictional portrayals of the Los Angeles Police Department
American thriller television films
Films produced by Ram Bergman
Films set in Los Angeles
The Kushner-Locke Company films
Films directed by Yuri Zeltser
1990s American films